The 2011–12 Virginia Cavaliers men's basketball team represented the University of Virginia during the 2011–12 NCAA Division I men's basketball season. The Cavaliers, led by third year head coach Tony Bennett, played their home games at John Paul Jones Arena and are members of the Atlantic Coast Conference. They finished the season 22–10, 9–7 in ACC play to finish in a three way tie for fourth place. They lost in the quarterfinals of the ACC Basketball tournament to North Carolina State. They received an at-large bid to the 2012 NCAA tournament where they lost in the first round to Florida.

The team was led by senior forward Mike Scott, who finished the season as a First team All-ACC Selection and runner up for the Conference Player of the Year.

Previous season
The Cavaliers finished the 2010–11 season 16–15 overall, 7–9 in ACC play and lost in the first round of the ACC tournament to Miami.

Roster
In December 2011, both Harrell and Johnson transferred from Virginia, to Auburn and San Diego State, respectively.

Schedule

|-
!colspan=9 style="background:#00214e; color:#f56d22;"| Non-conference regular season

|-
!colspan=9 style="background:#00214e; color:#f56d22;"| Conference regular season

|-
!colspan=9 style="background:#00214e; color:#f56d22;"| ACC Tournament

|-
!colspan=9 style="background:#00214e; color:#f56d22;"| NCAA tournament

Rankings

Team players drafted into the NBA

References

Virginia Cavaliers men's basketball seasons
Virginia
Virginia
Virginia Cavaliers men's basketball team
Virginia Cavaliers men's basketball team